Liberty Township is an inactive township in Madison County, in the U.S. state of Missouri.

Liberty Township was established in 1841.

References

Townships in Missouri
Townships in Madison County, Missouri